The Judge Henry Wood Jr. House is a historic home located at Clarksville, Mecklenburg County, Virginia. It is a two-story, Queen Anne style brick dwelling built in three sections.  The original section was built between about 1820 and 1840, and forms the center section.  The north wing was added after 1872, and the south wing, with an octagonal end, in the 1880s.  Confederate General William Mahone (1826-1895), owned the property from 1862 to 1868.

It was listed on the National Register of Historic Places in 1999.

References

Houses on the National Register of Historic Places in Virginia
Queen Anne architecture in Virginia
Houses completed in 1830
Houses in Mecklenburg County, Virginia
National Register of Historic Places in Mecklenburg County, Virginia
1830 establishments in Virginia